Little Woodcote is an area in the London Borough of Sutton, and also in the London Borough of Croydon and it is located in the south-east of the borough south of Woodcote Green and Carshalton on the Hill. Nearby is Oaks Park. The area falls within the Carshalton South and Clockhouse Ward of Sutton Borough.

Local Buses 
Local bus routes include 127, 166, 463, S4 (operates on Mondays to Saturdays) and school bus routes 612, 627 and 633.

References

Areas of London
Districts of the London Borough of Sutton